Elizabeth Washington may refer to:

 Betty Washington Lewis (1733–1797), younger sister of George Washington
 Elizabeth F. Washington (1871–1953), American portrait and landscape paintern